Lake Guyon is in the Canterbury region in the South Island of New Zealand. The stream draining the lake feeds into the Waiau Uwha River.

It was within the boundaries of the former St James Station but it is now surrounded by public conservation land. A backcountry hut is on its northern shore. The lake is administered by the Department of Conservation as a scenic reserve.

See also
List of lakes in New Zealand

References

External links
Department of Conservation - St James Conservation Area
Lake Guyon at Google Maps

Guyon